UFC 57: Liddell vs. Couture 3 was a mixed martial arts event held by the Ultimate Fighting Championship on February 4, 2006. It was held at the Mandalay Bay Events Center on the Las Vegas Strip in Nevada, and broadcast live on pay-per-view in the United States. 

Headlining the card was an anticipated rubber match between top UFC stars and former coaches of The Ultimate Fighter Chuck Liddell and Randy Couture, widely touted and marketed as MMA's first major trilogy.

It was the UFC's largest grossing gate to date, $3.3 million, in addition to an estimate of over 400,000 pay-per-view buys. The disclosed fighter payroll for the event was $667,000.

Results

Reported payout

Chuck Liddell: $250,000 

Randy Couture: $225,000 

Renato "Babalu" Sobral: $32,000 

Frank Mir: $26,000 

Paul Buentello: $22,000 

Joe Riggs: $20,000 

Mike Van Arsdale: $16,000 

Keith Jardine: $10,000 

Nick Diaz: $10,000 

Alessio Sakara: $10,000 

Brandon Vera: $10,000

Marcio Cruz: $8,000

Elvis Sinosic: $6,000

Jeff Monson: $6,000

Mike Whitehead: $5,000

Justin Eilers: $5,000

Branden Lee Hinkle: $4,000 

Gilbert Aldana: $2,000

Disclosed Fighter Payroll: $667,000

See also
 List of UFC champions
 List of UFC events
 2006 in UFC

References

External links
"Liddell’s KO Outshone Only by Couture’s Retirement" by Josh Gross, Sherdog, February 5, 2006, retrieved February 19, 2006
Mixed martial arts show results, Mandalay Bay, February 4, 2006 (PDF), Nevada State Athletic Commission, retrieved February 23, 2006
Top MMA Gates, Nevada State Athletic Commission, retrieved February 19, 2006
UFC PPV Buys Explode in 2006
UFC Fighter Salaries for 2006 (includes fighter salaries for UFC 57)

Ultimate Fighting Championship events
2006 in mixed martial arts
Mixed martial arts in Las Vegas
2006 in sports in Nevada